Sarbaz District is a district (bakhsh) in Sarbaz County, Sistan and Baluchestan Province, Iran. At the 2006 census, its population was 80,570, in 15,792 families.  The district has one city: Sarbaz. The district has five rural districts (dehestan): Kishkur Rural District, Minan Rural District, Naskand Rural District, Sarbaz Rural District and Sarkur Rural District.

References 

Sarbaz County
Districts of Sistan and Baluchestan Province